Ruifeng Li (born 2001) is an American chess grandmaster. He was awarded the title in 2017. As of January 2021, he is ranked 32nd best player in the US.

Li won the 

 Arkansas State Championship in 2011 at the age of 8. Later the same year he was the silver medalist in the World Youth Chess Championships under-10 section.

 2016 US national Open.

 North American Junior Open U20 in 2016.

 12@th annual Philadelphia Open in 2018.

He drew against world class players such as Fabiano Caruana, Gata Kamsky, Luke McShane, and Alexey Dreev.

References 

2001 births
Living people
American chess players
Chess grandmasters
People from Plano, Texas